The Muskwa-Kechika Management Area (M-K or M-KMA) is a provincially run tract of land in the far north of British Columbia. It has an advisory board that advises the government on land-use decisions. Established by provincial government legislation in 1998, the area is meant to be preserved as a wild area, but development is not forbidden. The land is divided into different zones, with varying levels of protection, although the whole area is supposed to be used according to an overall plan. The original plan called for 25% of the land to be turned into provincial parks, 60% to become "special management zones" where mining and oil and gas drilling was to be allowed, and 15% to become "special wildland zones" where logging is prohibited.

Name and geography 
The area include the Northern Rocky Mountains to the north of Lake Williston and the Rocky Mountain Foothills north of the Peace River and much of the southeastern Cassiar Mountains and a small portion of the northeastern Omineca Mountains. With the southern Selwyn and Mackenzie Mountains north of the Liard River, the area defines the Boreal Cordillera Ecozone.

Parks and protected areas 
(with area)
Dall River Old Growth Provincial Park 
Denetiah Provincial Park & Protected Area 
Dune Za Keyih Provincial Park & Protected Area 
Finlay-Russel Provincial Park & Protected Area 
Graham-Laurier Provincial Park  
Horneline Creek Provincial Park 
Kwadacha Wilderness Provincial Park 
Liard River Corridor/West Provincial Parks & Protected Area 
Liard River Hot Springs Provincial Park 
Muncho Lake Provincial Park 
Northern Rocky Mountains Provincial Park & Protected Area 
Ospika-Cones Ecological Reserve 
Prophet River Hot Springs Provincial Park 
Redfern-Keily Provincial Park 
Sikanni Chief River Ecological Reserve 
Stone Mountain Provincial Park 
Toad River Hotsprings Provincial Park

Notes

References

External links 
 
 Map
 Map of oil and gas tenures
 Map of mineral tenures
 Guide-Outfitter boundaries map
 Trapline Boundaries map

Geography of British Columbia
Canadian Rockies
Northern Interior of British Columbia